Chiusano d'Asti is a comune (municipality) in the Province of Asti in the Italian region Piedmont, located about  southeast of Turin and about  northwest of Asti.

Chiusano d'Asti borders the following municipalities: Asti, Camerano Casasco, Cinaglio, Cossombrato, Montechiaro d'Asti, and Settime.

Demographic evolution

References

External links
 www.comune.chiusanodasti.at.it

Cities and towns in Piedmont